Scone High School is a government-funded co-educational comprehensive secondary day school, located in the town of , in the Upper Hunter region of New South Wales, Australia. 

Established in 1889, the school enrolled approximately 350 students in 2018, from Year 7 to Year 12, of whom eleven percent identified as Indigenous Australians and two percent were from a language background other than English. The school is operated by the NSW Department of Education; the principal is Brian Drewe. 

The school's catchment area covers Scone, Aberdeen, Murrurundi and surrounding areas including Denman.

Overview 
Well known for its agricultural programme, Scone High School has been rewarded with success at the Royal Easter Show at Sydney for many years. The school is also well regarded for its sports and disciplinary programmes.

Notable alumni 

 Darren Albertrugby league player; represented Newcastle Knights, St. Helens and Cronulla Sharks
 Todd Lowrierugby league player; represented Parramatta Eels
 John Morrisrugby league player; represented Newcastle Knights, Parramatta Eels, Wests Tigers and Cronulla Sharks
 Dane Tilserugby league player; represented Canberra Raiders

See also 

 List of government schools in New South Wales
 List of schools in Hunter and the Central Coast
 Education in Australia

References

External links 
 
 NSW Department of Education and Training: Scone High School
 NSW Schools website

Educational institutions established in 1889
Public high schools in New South Wales
Scone, New South Wales
1889 establishments in Australia